Elander Victor Harris (June 10, 1905 – February 23, 1978) was an American professional baseball outfielder and manager in the Negro leagues.

Nicknamed "Vicious Vic", he was noted as one of the toughest players of his era in black baseball; Harris managed the Grays to first place in the Negro National League eight times (most for any manager in the Negro leagues) along with a Negro World Series title while being named to the East–West All-Star Game seven times. In eleven seasons as manager, he never had a losing season.

Career
A native of Pensacola, Florida, Harris was the brother of fellow Negro leaguer Neal Harris. He moved to Pittsburgh, Pennsylvania, in 1914 and played baseball at the local YMCA. Harris started his professional career shortly after his 18th birthday, playing two games for the Pittsburgh Keystones in 1922 before moving to the Cleveland Tate Stars in 1923 and the Cleveland Browns in 1924, before start a long association with the Homestead Grays in 1925 which lasted 23 years. At this time, Homestead were not a member of any established league as the team rarely played other top black squads in those years and so statistics are limited, but when the Grays did, they often showed themselves to be a superior team.

When Homestead joined the Eastern Colored League in 1928, Harris hit an anemic .204 average before the league folded, but he improved significantly in 1929, batting .350 in the high-offense American Negro League. In 1933 he hit .321 with Homestead, and .384 for the 1934 Pittsburgh Crawfords. The 1935 season brought Harris back to Homestead. He hit .342, as his eight home runs tied for fifth in the league and were even with Hall of Fame slugger Turkey Stearnes. A year later, he hit .315. In 1938, when Homestead dominated the league and won the first half with an .813 winning percentage, Harris led his team with a .380 batting average.

Harris managed the Grays during their years in league play, between 1935 and 1948, and piloted Homestead to eight pennants. He guided his team to six consecutive first-place finishes from 1937 through 1942 (with five pennants). He took a job with a defense plant after the 1942 season, for which he would play for the Grays when he could do so while Candy Jim Taylor stepped in to manage the team for the next two seasons (each resulted in Negro World Series championships); Harris went 4-for-28 in the 1943 Negro World Series while not playing in the latter.

He also played in six East-West All-Star games between 1933 and 1947, and managed the East team eight times, four more than Oscar Charleston, the next-most-frequent manager. He won the last held Negro World Series in 1948 as the Grays left the league not long after.

In the waning days of the Negro leagues, Harris coached for the 1949 Baltimore Elite Giants and managed the 1950 Birmingham Black Barons. Additionally, he played winter baseball in the Cuban League and managed Santurce in the Puerto Rican League from 1947 to 1950.

Available statistics indicate that Harris hit .305 (733 for 2,406), and his teams posted a 547–278–2 mark in organized league play (with undoubtedly a higher total if one takes independent play into account) and a 10–15 mark during post-season play. An excellent motivator, he was well liked and respected by his players.

Post-career and death
After post-integration, he served as coach of the 1949 Baltimore Elite Giants, he took one last managerial job with the Birmingham Black Barons in 1950 before he retired. He became the head custodian for the Castaic Union Schools in Castaic, California. He died at the age of 72 in San Fernando, California, from the after-effects of surgery for treatment of cancer. He was survived by his wife Dorothy and two children, Judith and Ronald.

Legacy
Harris has the most league pennants of any manager in Negro league baseball with seven. Just five other managers in baseball history have won seven pennants. Despite this, he has not been inducted into the Baseball Hall of Fame. He was considered in the 2006 Hall of Fame balloting, but he was not selected. On November 5, 2021, he was selected to the final ballot for the Baseball Hall of Fame's Early Days Committee for consideration in the Class of 2022. He received ten of the necessary twelve votes.

Managerial record

References

Notes

Sources
Biographical Dictionary of American Sports, by David L. Porter – p. 632/633

External links
 and Baseball-Reference Black Baseball stats and Seamheads
  and Seamheads
NLB Players Association

1905 births
1978 deaths
Chicago American Giants players
Homestead Grays players
Cleveland Browns (baseball) players
Cleveland Tate Stars players
Pittsburgh Crawfords players
Negro league baseball managers
Baseball outfielders
Baseball players from Pensacola, Florida
20th-century African-American sportspeople